The discography of American rock band Collective Soul consists of eleven studio albums, one live album, one compilation album, two extended plays, 38 singles, and 23 music videos.

Albums

Studio albums
{|class="wikitable"
!rowspan="2"| Year
!rowspan="2"| Album details
!colspan="6"| Peak chart positions
!rowspan="2"| Certifications(sales thresholds)
|-
!style="width:3em;font-size:90%"| US

!style="width:3em;font-size:90%"| USInd.

!style="width:3em;font-size:90%"| USAlt.

!style="width:3em;font-size:90%"| AUS

!style="width:3em;font-size:90%"| CAN

!style="width:3em;font-size:90%"| NZ
|-
| 1994
| align="left"| Hints Allegations and Things Left Unsaid
Released: March 22, 1994
Label: Atlantic
Formats: CD, CS
|align="center"| 15
|align="center"| —
|align="center"| —
|align="center"| 57
|align="center"| 5
|align="center"| 46
|
 RIAA: 2× Platinum
 CAN: 5× Platinum 
|-
| 1995
| align="left"| Collective Soul
Released: March 14, 1995
Label: Atlantic (#82745)
Formats: CD, CS
|align="center"| 23
|align="center"| —
|align="center"| —
|align="center"| 23
|align="center"| 4 
|align="center"| 1
|
 RIAA: 3× Platinum
 ARIA: Gold
 MC: 8× Platinum
|-
| 1997
| align="left"| Disciplined Breakdown
Released: March 11, 1997
Label: Atlantic (#82984)
Formats: CD, CS, LP
|align="center"| 16
|align="center"| 31
|align="center"| —
|align="center"| 37
|align="center"| 5
|align="center"| 3
|
 RIAA: Platinum
 MC: 2× Platinum
|-
| 1999
| align="left"| Dosage
Released: February 9, 1999
Label: Atlantic (#83162)
Formats: CD, CS
|align="center"| 21
|align="center"| —
|align="center"| —
|align="center"| 48
|align="center"| 5
|align="center"| 21
|
 RIAA: Platinum
 MC: Platinum
|-
| 2000
| align="left"| Blender
Released: October 10, 2000
Label: Atlantic (#83400)
Formats: CD, CS
|align="center"| 22
|align="center"| —
|align="center"| —
|align="center"| —
|align="center"| 3
|align="center"| —
|
 RIAA: Gold
 MC: Gold
|-
| 2004
| align="left"| Youth
Released: November 16, 2004
Label: El Music Group (#60001)
Formats: CD
|align="center"| 66
|align="center"| 3
|align="center"| —
|align="center"| —
|align="center"| 30
|align="center"| —
|
|-
| 2007
| align="left"| Afterwords
Released: August 28, 2007
Label: El Music Group (#660011)
Formats: CD, digital download
|align="center"| —
|align="center"| —
|align="center"| —
|align="center"| —
|align="center"| 23
|align="center"| —
|
|-
| 2009
| align="left"| Collective Soul ("Rabbit")
Released: August 25, 2009
Label: Loud & Proud
Formats: CD, digital download
|align="center"| 24
|align="center"| —
|align="center"| 8
|align="center"| —
|align="center"| 9
|align="center"| —
|
|-
| 2015
| align="left"| See What You Started by ContinuingReleased: October 2, 2015
Label: Vanguard 
Formats: CD, digital download, LP
|align="center"| 25
|align="center"| —
|align="center"| 1
|align="center"| —
|align="center"| —
|align="center"| —
|
|-
| 2019
| align="left"| Blood
Released: June 21, 2019
Label: Fuzze-Flex
Formats: CD, digital download, LP
|align="center"| —
|align="center"| 4
|align="center"| 15
|align="center"| —
|align="center"| —
|align="center"| —
|
|-
| 2022
| align="left"| Vibrating
Released: August 12, 2022
Label: Fuzze-Flex
Formats: CD, digital download, LP
|align="center"| —
|align="center"| 6
|align="center"| —
|align="center"| —
|align="center"| —
|align="center"| —
|
|-
| colspan="13" align="center" style="font-size: 8pt" | "—" denotes a release that did not chart.
|}Notes'''

Compilation albums

Live albums

Extended plays

Singles

Music videos

References

Discography
Alternative rock discographies
Discographies of American artists
Rock music group discographies